Wei Wang (born 21 March 1961) is a Chinese-born American table tennis player who represented the United States at the 1996 Summer Olympics. She competed in women's doubles with Lily Yip, who was also born in China. She was also a bronze medalist at the 1995 Pan American Games, partnering with Vietnamese-born Tawny Banh.

References

1961 births
Living people
Table tennis players from Beijing
American female table tennis players
Chinese female table tennis players
Table tennis players at the 1996 Summer Olympics
Olympic table tennis players of the United States
Chinese emigrants to the United States
Pan American Games bronze medalists for the United States
Pan American Games medalists in table tennis
Naturalised table tennis players
Table tennis players at the 1995 Pan American Games
Medalists at the 1995 Pan American Games
21st-century American women